Ain Taoujdate is a city in El Hajeb Province, Fès-Meknès, Morocco. It is located roughly halfway between the cities of Fez and Meknes and is serviced by the national ONCF train line. According to the 2004 census, it had a population of 22,030.

References

Populated places in El Hajeb Province
Municipalities of Morocco